

Current listings 

|}

Former listings

|}

Notes

References 

 
Clatsop County